El Alma Al Aire Tour is a concert tour by Spanish singer Alejandro Sanz as promoting his album El Alma al Aire.

Tour set list 

 Tiene Que Ser Pecado
 Aquello Que Me Diste
 Este Último Momento
 Llega, Llegó Soledad
 Cuando Nadie Me Ve
 Me Iré
 Hay Un Universo de Pequeñas Cosas
 Siempre Es de Noche
 Medley: Si Tú Me Miras, La Fuerza del Corazón, Si Hay Dios..., Viviendo Deprisa
 Hoy Que No Estás
 Mi Soledad y Yo
 El Alma al Aire
 Amiga Mía
 Y, ¿Si Fuera Ella?
 Quisiera Ser
 Bulería
 ¿Lo Ves?
 Corazón Partío

Tour dates

Box office score data (Billboard)

Band 

 Ludovico Vagnone – Musical Director, guitars and vocal
 Josep Salvador – Guitar and vocal
 Mauricio Scaramella – Drums
 Luis Duizaides – Percussion
 J. Agustín Guereñu – Bass
 Píero Vallero – Keyboards, sax and vocal
 Alfonso Pérez – Keyboards
 Lulo Pérez – Trumpet, percussion and keyboards
 Carlos Martín – Trombone
 Jon Robles – Saxophone
 Helen de Quiroga, Txell Sust, Luis Miguel Baladrón – Vocals

References

External links 
 Web oficial de Alejandro Sanz

2001 concert tours
2002 concert tours
Alejandro Sanz